Woodward's moray, Gymnothorax woodwardi, is a moray eel found in coral reefs in the Indian Ocean, around Australia. It was first named by McCulloch in 1912.

References

woodwardi
Fish described in 1912